William George Lyte (21 August 1898 – 11 December 1979) was an Australian rules footballer who played with Melbourne in the Victorian Football League (VFL).

Having served in the Army Reserve during World War I, Lyte later served in the Royal Australian Air Force during World War II as a carpenter.

Notes

External links 

 

1898 births
1979 deaths
Australian rules footballers from Melbourne
Melbourne Football Club players
People from St Kilda, Victoria
Military personnel from Melbourne
Australian military personnel of World War II
Australian military personnel of World War I